Jason Rivers (born May 12, 1984) is an American former gridiron football wide receiver. He played college football for the Hawaii Warriors, and was a favorite target of record-setting quarterback Colt Brennan.

Rivers places prominently on Hawaii's career receiving lists:
 2nd in career receptions (292)
 2nd in career receiving yards (3,919)
 3rd in career receiving touchdowns (35)

After not being selected in the 2008 NFL Draft, he was signed by the Tennessee Titans as a free agent but subsequently released.

Rivers is of Samoan and African American descent. Prior to playing college football, Rivers attended Saint Louis School in Honolulu.

See also
 2006 Hawaii Bowl, during which Rivers and Brennan set several Hawaii Bowl records and were named co-MVPs

References

1985 births
Living people
American football wide receivers
Hawaii Rainbow Warriors football players
Players of American football from Honolulu
American sportspeople of Samoan descent
African-American players of American football
21st-century African-American sportspeople
20th-century African-American people
Saint Louis School alumni